V. R. Gopalakrishnan was a Malayalam film director and story writer.

Career
He wrote the story / screenplay / dialogues for 16 films. His noteworthy films are Dheem Tharikida Thom, Cheppu and Vandanam, all directed by Priyadarshan. Gopalakrishnan also directed 4 films, one of which was unreleased.

He also worked as an associate director for 12 films, all directed by his close friend Priyadarshan.

Death
Gopalakrishnan committed suicide at his home in Ramanathapuram, Palakkad, Kerala on 11 January 2016, leaving behind his wife (Geetha) and two sons (Arjun and Aravind).

Filmography

References

External links
 

Malayalam film directors
Malayalam screenwriters
2016 deaths